Odessa Oil Refinery is the fourth-largest Ukrainian oil refinery and a strategically important facility for the state's economy. It is located in Odesa, Odesa Oblast, built in 1935, capacity, as of 2005, about 2.8 million tons of crude oil per year.

See also

 LukOil
 List of oil refineries
 Odesa Port Plant

References

Companies established in 1938
Companies of Ukraine by city
Economy of Ukraine by city
1935 in Ukraine
History of Odesa Oblast
Oil refineries in Ukraine
Companies based in Odesa Oblast
Oil refineries in the Soviet Union